Holalkere Anjaneya is an Indian Politician from the state of Karnataka. He is a member of the Karnataka Legislative Assembly representing the Holalkere constituency.

Political party
He is from the Indian National Congress.

Ministry
He was the Minister for Social Welfare in the Siddaramaiah led Karnataka Government from 2015-2018

Controversy
It was alleged that his wife took a bribe on his behalf in the rice distribution scam.

External links 
 Karnataka Legislative Assembly

References 

People from Yadgir district
Living people
Karnataka MLAs 2013–2018
Indian National Congress politicians from Karnataka
Year of birth missing (living people)